Dimitri Scarlato (born 21 April 1977) is an Italian composer and conductor, based in London.

Early life and education 
He received his degree in Composition, Conducting and Score Reading in 2004 at the Conservatorio Santa Cecilia in Rome while studying privately Jazz Piano and Classical Piano. After his studies in Rome, he studied conducting with Milen Nachev and Alexander Polyanichko in Saint Petersburg.
In 2004 he moved to London in order to pursue a Master’s in Composition at the Guildhall School of Music & Drama.
In 2014, he was awarded a Doctorate in Composition at the Royal College of Music, which in 2010 selected him as an RCM Rising Star.

Film and theatre scoring 
In 2003 he composed the music for the musical Piaf…l’Hymne à l’Amour, directed by Carlo Lizzani. The musical was performed at several prestigious Italian theatres, including the Teatro Regio in Parma and the Teatro Argentina in Rome.

While completing his Master’s in London, he began to collaborate with young directors from the London Film School and composed the music for several projects, including the short film The City in the Sky by Giacomo Cimini, which in 2009 was selected for the 66th Venice Film Festival. In 2009 he also composed and conducted the soundtrack for Per Sofia, a feature film by Ilaria Paganelli.

In 2007 he worked on the music pre-production for the film Sweeney Todd directed by Tim Burton.

In 2015 he was the music/conducting coach of Sir Michael Caine in Youth (2015 film), a film by the Oscar-winning director Paolo Sorrentino (2015). 
In 2015 he also composed the music score for Revelstoke. A Kiss in the Wind, a documentary directed by Nicola Moruzzi, which was selected for the final shortlist at the 2016 edition of the David di Donatello Awards. 

In 2019 he composed the music score for Il talento del calabrone, the first feature film directed in Italian by Giacomo Cimini, with Sergio Castellitto and Anna Foglietta, distributed by Amazon Prime Italy. 
Currently, he is the Area Leader in Composition for Screen at the Royal College of Music in London.

Contemporary classical music and operas 
His music has been performed at various venues, including the Barbican Hall and Cadogan Hall in London, the Teatro Olimpico in Rome and the Teatro La Fenice in Venice.
His two operas, Fadwa (2013) and La tregua di Natale, have been produced and staged by Accademia Filarmonica Romana and Nuova Consonanza.
In 2018 he composed In Limbo, which drew inspiration from the book In Limbo: Brexit testimonies from EU citizens in the UK by Italian activist Elena Remigi. Remigi commented: "Our limbo is not only about having the right documents or not. There is a psychological limbo too, in which we all feel we have plunged. My hope is that we can all return to behold the stars, content and settled as we were before this referendum".

The composition was commissioned by the International Spring Orchestra Festival Malta and received its first performance for the closing concert of the 12th International Spring Orchestra Festival at the Teatru Manoel, La Valletta (Malta) in April 2018. 
In 2018 he conducted the closing concert at the International Spring Festival in Malta, with a programme featuring Bartok, Lutoslawski, and two world premieres. He also conducted the 2022 closing concert at the same festival, with a programme that included Xenakis, Gubaidulina, Mahler and two world premieres.

Awards and honours 
In 2011 he was selected as a film composer at the Berlinale Talent Campus,  and was selected to join the VOX 3 – Composing for Voice workshop at the Royal Opera House in London.
In 2015 he won the 3rd Composition Competition at the International Spring Orchestra Festival in Malta.  
In 2020 he was awarded the second prize at the Opera Harmony Digital Festival with his mini-opera A Life Reset.
In 2021 he received the Award for Best Original Music for the film Intolerance directed by Giuliano Giacomelli and Lorenzo Giovenga at the Inventa un Film Festival.

Album releases 
In 2019 he released the Album Colours, in which each track is dedicated to a colour of the prism. The Album is developed as a journey through nine colours and the last colour White can be considered a synthesis.
Scarlato has stated: "I don’t see colours, I hear them", evoking a synaesthetic effect.
The project started around 2009 with the recording of the demos of Blue, Brown and Yellow – and was completed only a decade later; it draws inspiration from an eclectic range of composers,  Yann Tiersen, Ryuichi Sakamoto and Max Richter among them.
In the spirit of interdisciplinarity, Scarlato joined forces with poet Laura-Jane Foley, who composed poems for each colour for the live performances.
The project was developed in close collaboration with musicians Agnieszka Teodorowska (cello) and Yuriy Chubarenko (accordion). In 2017 Colours was performed for the first time in a concert.  Scarlato explained: "In this project, each colour has a story of its own and is connected to a person or event in my life. The music is very 'visual,' and it can be linked to images or stories. Gray for example evokes the memory of my father, blue recalls the melancholy of a love story that has ended. It would be interesting to see if my portrayal of colours is the same as the listener's."

References 

Living people
1977 births
20th-century Italian composers
21st-century Italian composers
Italian male film score composers
Italian film score composers
Italian male composers
21st-century Italian conductors (music)
21st-century Italian male musicians
Italian classical composers
Conservatorio Santa Cecilia alumni
Alumni of the Royal College of Music
Musicians from Rome
Italian music arrangers
Italian musical theatre composers
Male musical theatre composers